Table Rock Civilian Conservation Corps Camp Site is a historic Civilian Conservation Corps (CCC) camp site located near Pickens, Pickens County, South Carolina.  It contains remnants of the CCC construction of Table Rock State Park between 1935 and 1941, including the recreation hall chimney, bulletin board with adjacent benches, grotto fountain, and basin.

It was listed on the National Register of Historic Places in 1989.

References 

Civilian Conservation Corps in South Carolina
Buildings and structures in Pickens County, South Carolina
National Register of Historic Places in Pickens County, South Carolina
Campgrounds in the United States
Park buildings and structures on the National Register of Historic Places in South Carolina
Government buildings completed in 1941
1941 establishments in South Carolina
Campgrounds in South Carolina